Tai Ho may refer to:

 Tai Ho, also known as Tai Ho Wan, a place on Lantau Island, Hong Kong
Tai Ho Hall (Tai Ho Tien), a historic romanization of the Hall of Supreme Harmony in Beijing, China
Tai Ho, a recurring character in Suikoden

See also
 Tai Hau Wan (disambiguation)